Chilli vinegar is a variety of malt vinegar infused with chopped or whole chilli peppers, which originates from and is most popular in and around the British capital city, London. Many recipes in Eliza Acton's 1845 book Modern Cookery for Private Families contain chilli vinegar as an ingredient.

Chilli vinegar is commonly used on foods associated with London's Cockney culture including pie and mash, jellied eels, and other seafood served from the once ubiquitous fish stalls in the East End of London.

References

External links
Chilli vinegar recipe at epicurious.com

Chili sauce and paste
Culture in London
English cuisine
Vinegar